Miķelis is a Latvian male given name. It is also Latvian name of archangel Michael, therefore the celebration of autumn equinox is called Miķeļi in Latvian and Miķelis is named as protector of horses and good harvest, likely taking over functions of Jumis, a fertility deity in Latvian mythology.

Persons named Miķelis include:
 Miķelis Ežmalis (born 1990), Latvian canoer
 Miķelis Krogzemis (1850–1879), Latvian poet
 Miķelis Lībietis (born 1992), Latvian tennis player
 Miķelis Rēdlihs (born 1984), Latvian ice hockey player
 Miķelis Valters (1874–1968), Latvian politician

References

Latvian masculine given names